Changji is a county-level city situated about  west of the regional capital, Ürümqi in Northern Xinjiang, China and has about 390,000 inhabitants. It is the seat of Changji Hui Autonomous Prefecture. At the northeast corner of the modern city are the walls and other archaeological remains of the Tang dynasty city, usually referred to as Ancient Changji.

A Federation of Industry and Commerce is at Changji. In the area around Changji crop growing, animal husbandry and oil crop growing are important parts of the economy.
Changji is the home of Changji University.

Climate

Transport
Changji is served by China National Highway 312, the Northern Xinjiang and the Second Ürümqi-Jinghe Railways.

References

External links
Changji University

County-level divisions of Xinjiang
Populated places in Xinjiang
Changji Hui Autonomous Prefecture